Peter Dench (born 23 April 1972) is a British photojournalist working primarily in advertising, editorial and portraiture. His work has been published in a number of books.

Biography
Dench was born and grew up in Weymouth, Dorset. He graduated from the University of Derby with a degree in Photographic Studies in 1995 and has been working as a photojournalist since 1998. He currently lives in Crouch End, London.

Dench spent a decade documenting England, which he split into the following themes: drinkUK, ethnicUK, rainUK, loveUK, royalUK, summerUK, fashionUK, and Carry on England.

He was a member of the photo agency Independent Photographer's Group (IPG) from 2000 until the company's closure in 2005. In January 2012 he joined Reportage by Getty Images as one of their Represented Photographers (later known as Getty Verbatim).

Around 2007 Dench spent 15 months photographing Football's Hidden Story in 20 countries as a commission for FIFA, documenting "the way in which the sport thrives in the most improbable circumstances and in which enthusiasm for the game is being harnessed for the good of the community".

A Day Off in the Lives of Europe is a project in which he photographed people around Europe commemorating events of national significance.

Dench says of his work:
I’m always looking for humour in my pictures. Charlie Chaplin is a big influence and I often try to address serious subjects in a humorous way when appropriate. My aim is to make people laugh, make people think. Looking through the books of Elliott Erwitt and Martin Parr is the reason I got into photography. If you can travel the world making people laugh and making them think, then to me that's a fine way to live.

The Visa pour l'image photojournalism festival in Perpignan, France, has screened Dench's work five times (including Carry On England in 2009) and exhibited it once.

He was described in 2011 as a contributing editor of Hungry Eye magazine and creative director of White Cloth Gallery in Leeds, which he founded with co-creative director Sharon Price. He was a contributor to Professional Photographer magazine podcasts 1 to 13 in 2010/2011. His monthly Dench Diary appeared in Professional Photographer in 2010/11 and in Hungry Eye from 2011.

Dench's advertising commissions have appeared on billboards and bus stop posters, in corporate brochures and in newspapers, including campaigns for Weetabix, Barclaycard, Barclays Wealth, Suzuki, the British Heart Foundation, Danish Bacon and Maxim magazine.

He has made formal portraits of Tom Jones, Vinnie Jones, Heston Blumenthal, Freddie Flintoff, Alain Ducasse, Jamie Oliver, Vijay Mallya, Zöe Lucker, Tamsin Greig, Ahmet Ertegun, Alicia Silverstone and Dermot Desmond.

In February 2012 Dench successfully used the Emphas.is visual journalism crowd funding website to raise funds for his first book, England Uncensored,
 published in May 2012.

For 6 months in 2013 he collaborated with Reportage by Getty Images on the Future of Britain project, commissioned by OMD UK. Dench photographed the country to accompany OMD's research and statistics on the long-term economic downturn and changes to its population and demographics, published on a blog throughout the period.

In 2015 he founded The Curators with co-founder Director Sharon Price, curating and touring photography exhibitions and Photo North Festival across the UK

Publications

Publications by Dench
England Uncensored. Dublin: Emphas.is, 2012. .
The Dench Diary: The Diary of a Sometimes Working Professional Photographer. Eastbourne: United Nations of Photography, 2013. . Edition of 250 copies.
A&E: Alcohol and England. Liverpool: Bluecoat, 2014. .
The British Abroad. Liverpool: Bluecoat, 2014. . With an introduction and afterword by Dench.
Dench Does Dallas. Liverpool: Bluecoat, 2015. . With a foreword by Dench.
The English Summer Season. Little Neston, UK: Fistful, 2019. Edition of 125 copies.

Zines by Dench
Suited and Booted. Southport: Café Royal, 2013. Edition of 150 copies.
Trawlermen. Southport: Café Royal, 2015. Edition of 150 copies.
The English Summer Season. Fistful of Books, 2019. Edition of 100 copies.
Football’s Hidden Story. Fistful of Books, 2019. Edition of 125 copies.
Sun, Sea & Covid-19. Fistful of Books, 2020. Edition of 125 copies.
Lockdown Fanatical Football Fans. Fistful of Books, 2020. Edition of 125 copies.
The Tale of the Tape. Fistful of Books, 2020. Edition of 125 copies.

Publications edited or with contributions by Dench
Joop Swart Masterclass 10 Years. Amsterdam: World Press Photo, 2004. .
UK at Home – a celebration of where we live and love. Included Pics for pickers. London: Duncan Baird, 2008. .
Sony World Photography Awards 2010. Featured Someone's Had Their Weetabix. Paris: Verlhac, 2010. .
Professional Photography: The New Global Landscape Explained. Oxford: Focal, 2014. . By Grant Scott. With contributions from Dench as well as Alicia Bruce, Chris Floyd, Niall McDiarmid and Jim Mortram.
Great Britons of Photography Vol.1: The Dench Dozen. Eastbourne, UK: Hungry Eye, 2016. . With photographs by and transcripts of interviews between Dench and Jocelyn Bain Hogg, Marcus Bleasdale, Harry Borden, John Bulmer, Chris Floyd, Brian Griffin, Laura Pannack, Martin Parr, Tom Stoddart, Homer Sykes, and Anastasia Taylor-Lind. 160 pages. Edition of 500 copies.

Awards
2nd place, Advertising category, Sony World Photography Awards
Roadside Diners, July 1998 selected for National Portrait Gallery's John Kobal Photographic Portrait Award, London, 1999
George, Naturist, Palm Springs, October 2000 selected for National Portrait Gallery, John Kobal Photographic Portrait Award, London, 2001
1 of 12 photographers selected to take part in World Press Photo Joop Swart Masterclass 2002
3rd prize, People in the News category, World Press Photo Award, 2002 for Drinking of England
Marquesa deVarela, social fixer for Hello! magazine, April 2003 selected for National Portrait Gallery's Schweppes Photographic Portrait Prize, London, 2003
1st place, Sport category, Football in Liberia, 3rd Annual Photography Masters Cup, International Color Awards, 2009

Exhibitions

Solo exhibitions
Finding Faith, Ourhouse Gallery, Brighton, 2006
LoveUK, Third Floor Gallery, Cardiff, 2010
England Uncensored, Central European House of Photography (CEHP), Bratislava, Slovakia, 2013
Dench Does Dallas, Art Bermondsey Project Space, London, 2015; The Gallery at Munro House, Leeds, 2016

Group exhibitions
Football's Hidden Story, Liberia, The Foto8 Summershow, 2008
2 images from loveUK, The Foto8 Summershow, 2010
Letters from Europe, Ernest Lluch Cultural Center, San Sebastián, Spain, 2011. One of six contributing photographers. Project co-financed by the European Commission's Daphne III programme.
England Uncensored, White Cloth Gallery, Leeds, UK, 2012

Exhibitions at festivals
Drinking of England, GetxoPhoto photography festival, Getxo, Bilbao, Spain, 2010
England Uncensored – A Decade of Photographing the English, Visa pour l'image festival of photojournalism, Perpignan, France, 2011
Periscopio festival of photojournalism, Vitoria, Spain, 2011
Format International Photography Festival, Derby, UK, 2011. Video installation.
The British Abroad, The International Photoreporter Festival #2, Saint-Brieuc, France, 2013; POP Galleries, Hull International Photography Festival, Hull, UK, 2015

Alcohol & England, Hull International Photography Festival, Hull, UK, 2016.

Short films
Cosplay (2011) with Ben Turner
 The War & Peace Show (2011) with Ben Turner

Notes

References

External links
 
 Peter Dench at Reportage by Getty Images
 'Shoot and Move On: A Day in the Life of Street Photographers' by Sony Ericcsson on YouTube featuring Peter Dench

Photographers from Dorset
English photojournalists
Street photographers
Alumni of the University of Derby
21st-century British photographers
20th-century British photographers
People from Weymouth, Dorset
Living people
1972 births